Střílky is a municipality and village in Kroměříž District in the Zlín Region of the Czech Republic. It has about 600 inhabitants.

Geography
The northern part of the municipality lies in the Litenčice Hills, the southern part lies in a forested landscape of the Chřiby range.

History
The first written mention of Střílky is from 1261, when the local castle was documented. In 1486, a castle chapel was built. After 1486, the castle lost its significance and in 1542 it was already abandoned.

Sights

Only several fragments of the Gothic Střílky Castle are preserved to this day.

A fortress was built in Střílky in the 16th century. In the 17th century it was rebuilt to a representative Baroque residence, and in the 18th century it was further extended. It includes a castle park. Today the castle complex is privately owned.

References

External links

Villages in Kroměříž District